The following lists events that happened during 1910 in South Africa.

Incumbents

Cape Colony
 Governor of the Cape of Good Hope: Maj Gen Henry Scobell (acting) (until 30 May).
 Prime Minister of the Cape of Good Hope: John X. Merriman (until 30 May).

Natal
 Governor of the Colony of Natal: The Lord Methuen (until 30 May).
 Prime Minister of the Colony of Natal: Frederick Robert Moor (until 28 April).

Orange River Colony
 Governor of the Orange River Colony: Sir Hamilton Goold-Adams (until 30 May).
 Prime Minister of the Orange River Colony: Abraham Fischer (until 30 May).

Transvaal
 Governor of the Transvaal Colony and High Commissioner for Southern Africa: The Earl of Selborne (until 30 May).
 Prime Minister of the Transvaal Colony: Louis Botha (until 30 May).

Union of South Africa
 Monarch: King George V (starting 31 May).
 Governor-General of the Union of South Africa and High Commissioner for Southern Africa: The Viscount Gladstone (from 31 May).
 Prime Minister of the Union of South Africa: Louis Botha (from 31 May).
 Chief Justice: John de Villiers, 1st Baron de Villiers.

Events

May
 31 – The Union of South Africa is established from the former British colonies of the Cape of Good Hope, Natal, Transvaal and Orange River Colony.
 31 – Herbert John Gladstone becomes the first Governor-General of the Union of South Africa.
 31 – Louis Botha becomes the first Prime Minister of the Union of South Africa.

September
 17 – King Geoge V granted an official coat of arms to the Union.

November
 4 –  1st South African Parliament opened.

December
 28 – Official flag badges approved for the Union.

Unknown date
 The Girl Guides movement is established.
 The white population in South Africa is 21.5% of the total.
 Witwatersrand gold mine owners come under pressure to improve sanitary conditions since a third of the black miners are dying of pneumonia.
 The Pretoria and Johannesburg branches of the Transvaal University College (TUC) split into independent institutions. The branches will later become the University of Pretoria (Tuks) and the University of the Witwatersrand (Wits) respectively.

Births
 24 March – Adolph Malan, World War II fighter pilot. (d. 1963)
 9 July – Govan Mbeki, anti-apartheid activist and politician. (d. 2001)
 30 September – Monty Naicker, medical doctor and politician. (d. 1978)
 26 November – Cyril Cusack, South African–born actor (d. 1993)

Deaths

Railways

Railway lines opened
 21 March – Cape Eastern – Riverside (Natal) to Malenge, .
 27 April – Natal – Utrecht Junction to Utrecht, .
 29 April – Transvaal – Belfast to Lydenburg, .
 15 May – Transvaal – Komatipoort to Newington, .
 4 July – Transvaal – Dunswart to Cranbourne, .

Locomotives
Natal
 Four new Cape gauge locomotive types enter service on the Natal Government Railways (NGR):
 Two Class A  Pacific type locomotives, built in their Durban workshops. In 1912, these locomotives will be designated Class 2C on the South African Railways (SAR).
 A single Class B  Mountain type locomotive, also known as the America D and nicknamed "Maud Allan" by the enginemen. In 1912, it will be designated Class 3A on the SAR.
 Twenty-one Class B  Mastodon type tender locomotives. In 1912, they will be designated Class 1A on the SAR.
 Five  Mallet articulated compound steam locomotives. In 1912, they will be designated  on the SAR.

Transvaal
 Five new Cape gauge locomotive types enter service on the Central South African Railways (CSAR):
 In March, ten Class 10-2  Pacific type steam locomotives, five with and five without superheaters. In 1912, they will be designated Class 10A (saturated steam) and Class 10B (superheated) on the SAR.
 Twelve lighter Class 10-C  Pacific type locomotives. In 1912, they will be designated Class 10C on the SAR.
 One American-built Class 10  Pacific type. In 1912, it will be designated the sole Class 10D on the SAR.
 Also in March, a single experimental  Mallet articulated locomotive. In 1912, it will be designated Class MD on the SAR.

References

South Africa
Years in South Africa
History of South Africa